Musical December 2013 With Kim Junsu is an extended play released by South Korean singer XIA (Kim Junsu). The album contains songs from the musical December, in which the singer plays the lead role on stage; as well as collaborations with Lyn and Gummy.

Track list

Charts

References

 

2013 EPs
K-pop EPs
Kim Junsu albums
Korean-language EPs